Raoul Cédric Loé (born 31 January 1989) is a professional footballer who currently plays for China League One side Shaanxi Chang'an Athletic as a defensive midfielder.

Club career
Born in Courbevoie, Paris, Loé moved to Spain in 2008 at the age of 19, and joined amateur team Manchego CF. On 14 August 2009, he signed a contract with AD Ceuta in the third division after impressing in a trial; he played 35 games in his first year, and appeared in both round-of-32 legs against FC Barcelona in the following season's Copa del Rey.

In the 2011 off-season, Loé moved to CA Osasuna, being assigned to their reserves also in the third level. He was first summoned to a La Liga match on 21 December 2011, but remained on the bench against UD Almería.

Loé made his official debut for the Navarrese on 12 January 2012, against Barcelona in the campaign's domestic cup (1–2 home loss, 1–6 on aggregate). On 3 March, he played his first league game by appearing the full 90 minutes in a 1–1 draw at RCD Mallorca.

On 1 July 2015, Loé moved to Qatar after agreeing to a contract with Al-Sailiya SC. The free agent returned to the Spanish top flight and Osasuna on 6 February 2017, signing until the end of the season.

On 31 August 2017, Loé joined Bulgarian club PFC CSKA Sofia, being released at the end of the campaign. On 20 June 2018, he signed with AC Omonia from Cyprus.

International career
On 1 June 2013, Loé was called up by Cameroon for the first time, for a friendly with Ukraine. He made his debut on the following day, starting in a 0–0 draw at the Olimpiyskiy National Sports Complex.

Career statistics

References

External links

1989 births
Living people
French sportspeople of Cameroonian descent
Citizens of Cameroon through descent
Footballers from Hauts-de-Seine
French footballers
Cameroonian footballers
Association football midfielders
La Liga players
Segunda División players
Segunda División B players
Tercera División players
AD Ceuta footballers
CA Osasuna B players
CA Osasuna players
Qatar Stars League players
Al-Sailiya SC players
First Professional Football League (Bulgaria) players
PFC CSKA Sofia players
Cypriot First Division players
AC Omonia players
China League One players
Shaanxi Chang'an Athletic F.C. players
Cameroon international footballers
2015 Africa Cup of Nations players
French expatriate footballers
Cameroonian expatriate footballers
Expatriate footballers in Spain
Expatriate footballers in Qatar
Expatriate footballers in Bulgaria
Expatriate footballers in Cyprus
Expatriate footballers in China
French expatriate sportspeople in Spain
French expatriate sportspeople in Qatar
French expatriate sportspeople in Bulgaria
French expatriate sportspeople in Cyprus
Cameroonian expatriate sportspeople in Spain
Cameroonian expatriate sportspeople in Qatar
Cameroonian expatriate sportspeople in Bulgaria
People from Courbevoie